Prisoner of Azkaban generally refers to the novel Harry Potter and the Prisoner of Azkaban by J. K. Rowling.

Prisoner of Azkaban may also refer to:

 Harry Potter and the Prisoner of Azkaban (film), a film adaptation of the novel directed by Alfonso Cuarón
 Harry Potter and the Prisoner of Azkaban (soundtrack), the soundtrack to the film composed by John Williams
 Harry Potter and the Prisoner of Azkaban (video game), the game based on the film
 Sirius Black, the character referred to in the title